Future International is a 54-floor 236 meter (774 foot) tall skyscraper completed in 2007 located in Chongqing, China.

See also
 List of tallest buildings in the world

External links

Office buildings completed in 2007